Ichneutica plena is a moth of the family Noctuidae. It is endemic to New Zealand. It is widespread throughout the North, South and Stewart Islands. It is a variable in appearance and therefore can be confused with its near relatives I. peridotea and I. insignis. The larvae of I. plena feed on herbaceous plants including Fuchsia excorticata, Coprosma species, and introduced species such as garden fuchsia as well as crops such as apple trees. Adults of this species are on the wing from late August until May.

Taxonomy 
This species was first described by Francis Walker in 1865 from a male specimen collected by T. R. Oxley. Although the original scientific description states the specimen originated in Auckland, the correct type locality is in Nelson. Walker originally named the species Erana plena.The lectotype specimen is held at the Natural History Museum, London. In 1880 Arthur Gardiner Butler, thinking he was describing a new species, named it Dianthoecia viridis. Edward Meyrick synonymised this name in 1887. In 1988 J. S. Dugdale, in his catalogue of New Zealand Lepidoptera, placed this species within the Graphania genus. 

In 2019 Robert Hoare undertook a major review of New Zealand Noctuidae species. During this review the genus Ichneutica was greatly expanded and the genus Graphania was subsumed into that genus as a synonym. As a result of this review, this species is now known as Ichneutica insignis. However Hoare in that review raised the possibility that more than one species is encompassed within this species. His reasoning for this hypothesis is the species' variable wing pattern, the differences in the pectinations of the male antenna, the differing shapes of the male and female genitalia and the different chemical makeup of the female sex pheromones.

Description 

George Hudson describes the larva of this species as follows:

Walker described the male adult of the species as follows:
The wingspan of the male of this species is between 31.5 and 39 mm and for the female is between 31 and 40 mm. I. plena is a variable species and can be confused with closely related species such I. peridotea and I. insignis.

Distribution 
I. plena is endemic to New Zealand. It is widespread throughout the North, South and Stewart Islands.

Behaviour 
Adults of this species are on the wing from late August to May.

Life cycle and host species 
The larvae of this species eat various herbaceous plants including Fuchsia excorticata, Coprosma species, and garden fuchsia. The larvae have also been recorded feeding on apples.

References

Hadeninae
Moths of New Zealand
Moths described in 1865
Endemic fauna of New Zealand
Taxa named by Francis Walker (entomologist)
Endemic moths of New Zealand